John Buckner may refer to:
 John Buckner (bishop), Anglican clergyman and Bishop of Chichester
 John Buckner (Colorado politician), member of the Colorado House of Representatives
 John Buckner (burgess), member of the Virginia House of Burgesses
 John Clinton Buckner, state legislator in Illinois

See also
 Jack Buckner, British athlete